Los Silos is a municipality and town in the northwestern part of the island Tenerife, Canary Islands, Spain. It is located on the north coast, 57 km West of the capital Santa Cruz de Tenerife.

Its name first appears in 1509, when the agricultural activity of the region made necessary the construction of silos to store  cereals. The town located at the heart of the Teno Massif, contains an extremely valuable and interesting wealth of plant and animal life. The leafy laurisilva woodlands are in stark contrast with the plains on the coast, which still hold small areas of cardones and tabaibas, furrowed by steep-sided ravines which are routes bringing together the highlands and the coast.

Among the plant formations, the most outstanding is the cardonal–tabaibal which occupies the lower parts of the district, practically from sea level up to areas close to the old coastal cliffs, which separate the sector of the oldest Isla Baja from the Monte Verde, a woodland with great water needs whose existence depends on the additional moisture brought by the sea of clouds which reaches the island on the Trade Winds.
The Monte del Agua is, together with the mountains of Anaga, the main representation on the island of Tenerife of the Canarian Monte Verde and is still relatively well-conserved, among other reasons, as a result of the steepness of the terrain, furrowed by a large number of deep ravines and sheltering in its immense mass of forest one of the best populations of the endemic white-tailed laurel pigeon and Bolle's laurel pigeon. For all these reasons, a large part of our municipal territory is included within the Canarian network of Protected Natural Spaces including the Parque Rural de Teno, Site of Special Scientific Interest and the los Acantilados de La Culata Protected Landscape.
All of this landscape is criss-crossed by a multitude of footpaths, delimited by dry-stone walls, which past generations for many years created and embellished even cobbling the steepest parts so as to enable animals shod with horseshoes and beasts of burden to obtain a better grip, and now with the passage of time and thanks to the sensitivity of the current inhabitants, these old footpaths have been recovered .

References 

Municipalities in Tenerife

Bien de Interés Cultural landmarks in the Province of Santa Cruz de Tenerife